The sun-loving litter-skink (Lygisaurus zuma) is a species of skink found in Queensland in Australia.

References

Lygisaurus
Reptiles described in 1993
Skinks of Australia
Endemic fauna of Australia
Taxa named by Patrick J. Couper